This article displays the squads of the teams that competed in EuroBasket 2017 qualification. Each team consists of 12 players.

Age and club as of the start of the tournament, 31 August 2016.

Group A

Belgium

Cyprus

Iceland

Switzerland

Group B

Austria

Denmark

Germany

Netherlands

Group C

Bosnia and Herzegovina

Russia

Sweden

Group D

Belarus

Estonia

Poland

Portugal

Group E

Bulgaria

Kosovo

Slovenia

Ukraine

Group F

Albania

Georgia

Montenegro

Slovakia
}

Group G

Great Britain

Hungary

Luxembourg

Macedonia

External links
Official website

qualification squads